The Vesta family (adj. Vestian) is a family of asteroids. The cratering family is located in the inner asteroid belt in the vicinity of its namesake and principal body, 4 Vesta. It is one of the largest asteroid families with more than 15,000 known members and consists of mostly bright V-type asteroids, so-called "vestoids".

Characteristics 

The Vestian asteroids consist of 4 Vesta, the second-most-massive of all asteroids (mean diameter of 530 km), and many small asteroids below 10 km diameter. The brightest of these, 1929 Kollaa and 2045 Peking, have an absolute magnitude of 12.2, which would give them a radius of about 7.5 km assuming the same high albedo as 4 Vesta.

The family originated from an impact on asteroid 4 Vesta, with the giant south-polar crater the likely impact site. The family are thought to be the source of the HED meteorites.

The Vesta family also includes a few J-type asteroids (related to the V-type), which are thought to have come from the deeper layers of Vesta's crust, and are similar to the diogenite meteorites.

A HCM numerical analysis (by Zappala 1995) determined a large group of 'core' family members, whose proper orbital elements lie in the approximate ranges:

This gives the approximate boundaries of the family. At the present epoch, the range of osculating orbital elements of these core members is:

The Zappala 1995 analysis found 235 core members. A search of a recent proper-element database (AstDys) for 96,944 minor planets in 2005 yielded 6,051 objects (about 6% of the total) lying within the Vesta-family region as per the first table above.

Interlopers 

Spectroscopic analyses have shown that some of the largest Vestians are in fact interlopers. They are not of the V or J spectral class, but have similar orbital elements by coincidence. These include 306 Unitas, 442 Eichsfeldia, 1697 Koskenniemi, 1781 Van Biesbroeck, 2024 McLaughlin, 2029 Binomi, 2086 Newell, 2346 Lilio, and others. (Identified by inspection of the PDS asteroid taxonomy data set).

References 
 Zappalà, Vincenzo; Bendjoya, Philippe; Cellino, Alberto; Farinella, Paolo; and Froeschlé, Claude; Asteroid Families: Search of a 12,487-Asteroid Sample Using Two Different Clustering Techniques, Icarus, Volume 116, Issue 2 (August 1995), pages 291–314
 Bus, Schelte J.; and Binzel, Richard P.; Phase II of the Small Main-Belt Asteroid Spectroscopic Survey, Icarus Vo.. 158, p. 106 (2002). Data set online here.
 AstDys site. Proper elements for 96944 numbered minor planets.

Asteroid groups and families